Lamine Cissé may refer to:

People 
 Mohammed Lamine Cissé, A French Professional Footballer on the Ligue 2 team Nancy
 Lamine Moise Cissé A Senegalese Professional Footballer
 Lamine Cissé (General) (1939–2019) General of the Army, and Minister of the Interior of Senegal